Feustel is a surname. Notable people with the name include:

Andrew J. Feustel (born 1965), American geophysicist and a NASA astronaut
Chris J. Feustel (born 1971), American derivatives trader
Ingeborg Feustel (1926–1998), German writer 
Louis Feustel (1884–1970), American horse trainer

See also
Robert M. Feustel House, historic home located at Fort Wayne, Indiana (US)